Gérard Paul Errera  (born 30 October 1943) is a French diplomat and serves as an advisor to a number of American, Chinese and French international firms.

Early life and education 

Gérard Errera comes from a Jewish family, and was born in Brive-la-Gaillarde, in what was, during World War II, France's Free Zone. The Erreras were hidden and saved by a French family during the German occupation under the Vichy regime. Right after the war, he moved to Paris where he completed his education, and graduated from two French elite institutions, L'Institut d'Etudes Politiques de Paris (Sciences Po), and the Ecole Nationale d'Administration (ENA).

Gérard Errera is the brother of Roger Errera (1933–2014), who was a member of the Conseil d'Etat, and director of the Diaspora series (Calmann-Lévy), and whose life and work is remembered through a website: www.rogererrera.fr.

Current career and board memberships 

Errera is chairman of the Blackstone Group France, and member of Blackstone International Advisory Board. He is also the Senior Adviser for International Affairs to the French law firm August & Debouzy. In addition, Errera also serves on the advisory committee of the International Capital Conference (ICC), which is an annually held forum gathering China's top entrepreneurs, CEOs and officials with their European counterparts. Errera, a supporter of the arts, is also on the board of directors of the Musee des Arts decoratifs.

Errera served as a member of the supervisory board of Orano (formerly AREVA), the global leader in nuclear energy (2007-2009) and a Director of Electricité de France (EDF, 2007-2009). He is a frequent contributor to the Financial Times and other international newspapers.

Diplomatic career 

Errera has spent the last two years before joining Blackstone as secretary general of the French Ministry of Foreign Affairs from 2007 to 2009. This is the highest-ranking position in the French Foreign service, and effectively oversaw the foreign policy and all French diplomatic missions, alongside the minister.

During that time, Errera was appointed by the French president Sarkozy, as "Ambassadeur de France", a lifelong dignity, and the highest title a French career diplomat.

Prior to this Errera was the French ambassador to the United Kingdom for five years, from 2002 to 2007. At a time when Franco-British relationships were particularly tense, Gerard Errera was especially appreciated by the British, being called by the press "one of the wittiest and wisest diplomats in modern times, a worthy follower in the footsteps of Talleyrand". Mr Errera was a fierce defender of the principled and moral view not to invade Iraq, and was characterised as a"model of discretion, and master of the unspoken inference".

He also served as the French ambassador to the North Atlantic Treaty Organization (NATO) and director general for political affairs. During that time, he was one of the architects of the St Malo Treaty in 1998, which was the founding moment of European defence

He was the French special representative of President Chirac for strategic dialogue with India during 1998–2002. Before that, Gerard Errera was director for international affairs at the French Atomic Energy Commission and governor for France at the International Atomic Energy Agency. From 1991 to 1995, he served as the French ambassador to the Conference on Disarmament in Geneva.

Errera started his career at the French embassy in Washington, then was appointed as special adviser to the French foreign minister. He also served as the French general consul in San Francisco, at the time of the development of the Silicon Valley, and in Madrid from 1977 to 1980.

Family 

He is married to Virginia Bedoya Calvo, who is Bolivian-Argentinian. They have three children together: Philippe, Emmanuelle and Alexandre. His eldest son, Philippe, is also a diplomat.

Distinctions 
Ambassadeur de France,
Légion d'Honneur (Officer)
Ordre du Mérite (Officer)
Royal Victorian Order (CVO, Commander)
Order of the White Rose of Finland (Officer)
Order of Saint Charles, Monaco (Knight)
Orden del Merito Civil (Officer)

References

1943 births
Living people
Sciences Po alumni
École nationale d'administration alumni
Ambassadors of France to the United Kingdom
The Blackstone Group people
Areva people
Électricité de France people
Officiers of the Légion d'honneur
French chairpersons of corporations